Beat Happening/Screaming Trees is an EP and a one-off collaboration between Beat Happening (from Olympia, Washington) and Screaming Trees (from Ellensburg, Washington). The 12-inch EP was originally released on Homestead Records in 1988, and it was later reissued as part of Beat Happening's box set Crashing Through in 2002. The journal of Kurt Cobain contains a draft of a letter sent to Mark Lanegan, in which he described "Polly Pereguinn" as his favorite pop song of the 1980s.

The album itself was recorded in the back room of the Conner's family video store, New World Video, which was also used as a practice space for the Screaming Trees.

Track listing
"Sea Babies"
"Tales of Brave Aphrodite"
"Polly Pereguinn"
"I Dig You"

Credits
Personnel
 Mark Lanegan - Vocals
 Calvin Johnson - Vocals
 Heather Lewis - Drums, Backing Vocals
 Gary Lee Conner - Guitar, Backing Vocals
 Van Conner - Bass, Backing Vocals
 Bret Lunsford - Guitar
 Mark Pickerel - Drums
Additional Personnel
 Steve Fisk - Producer
 Chris Gehringer - Mastering

References

1988 EPs
Beat Happening albums
Screaming Trees albums
Collaborative albums
Alternative rock EPs
K Records EPs